Koorali is a place situated at Kottayam district of Kerala, India.

Panamattom, Elamgulam, Thampalakad, Kanjirappally and Ponkunnam are the nearest places to Koorali.

References

Villages in Kottayam district